Christoph Wittich or Christophorus Wittichius (1625, in Brieg – 1687, in Leiden) was a Dutch theologian. He is known for attempting to reconcile Descartes' philosophy with the Scriptures.

Life
He studied theology in Bremen, Groningen and Leiden, and taught theology, mathematics, and Hebrew at Herborn (1651–53), Duisburg (1653–55), Nijmegen (1655–1671) and Leiden (1671–1687). Starting from his 1653 publication Dissertationes Duæ he defended a non-literal interpretation of the Bible texts that were quoted by Voetius to prove the unscriptural nature of Descartes' Copernican beliefs, and tried to reconcile philosophy and theology.

Works
Dissertationes Duæ, Amsterdam, 1653.
De Stylo Scripturae, Amsterdam (?), 1656
Consensus veritatis in Scriptura divina et infallibili revelatae cum veritate philosophica a Renato detecta, Nijmegen, 1660
Theologia pacifica, Leiden, 1671.
Anti-spinoza, Amsterdam, 1690 (posthumous).

Further reading 

Ernst Bizer, D. ref. Orthodoxie u. d. Cartesianismus, in: ZThK 55, 1958, 306-372

Roberto Bordoli s.v., The Dict. of Seventeenth and Eighteenth-Century Dutch Philosophers, II, 2003, 1083–1086.

Cellamare, Davide, "A theologian teaching Descartes at the Academy of Nijmegen (1655–1679): class notes on Christoph Wittich’s course on the Meditations on First Philosophy", Intellectual History Review, 30:4, 585-613  
https://www.tandfonline.com/doi/full/10.1080/17496977.2019.1698874

Cuno, "Wittich, Christoph" in: Allgemeine Deutsche Biographie 43 (1898), S. 631-635 [Online-Version]; URL: https://www.deutsche-biographie.de/pnd119252805.html#adbcontent 

Kai-Ole Eberhardt, Art. Wittich, Christoph. Biographisch-Bibliographisches Kirchenlexikon Band XXXVII (2016) 1493–1507.Online-Artikel 

Kai-Ole Eberhardt, Christoph Wittich (1625–1687). Reformierte Theologie unter dem Einfluss von René Descartes, Göttingen 2018 (Reformed Historical Theology 47).()

Kai-Ole Eberhardt, Vernunft und Offenbarung in der Theologie Christoph Wittichs (1625–1687). Prolegomena und Hermeneutik der reformierten Orthodoxie unter dem Einfluss des Cartesianismus, Göttingen 2019 (FSÖTh 164) 

Jacob Gronovius, Laudatio Funebris recitata post obitum [...] Christophori Wittichii [...], Leiden 1687.

Georg Pape, Christoph Wittichs Anti-Spinoza. Diss. Rostock 1910.

Jan Rohls, Descartes u. d. ref. Theol., in: Sonderforschungsbereich 573 „Pluralisierung u. Autorität i. d. Frühen Neuzeit“ an d. LMU München, Mitteilungen 2/2006, München 2006, 24-34

Theo Verbeek, Descartes and the Dutch. Early Reactions to Cartesian Philosophy, 1637–1650. Published for the Journal of the History of Philosophy, Carbondale 1992

Rienk H.Vermij, The Calvinist Copernicans. The reception of the new astronomy in the Dutch Republic, 1575–1750, Amsterdam 2002

External links 
 Willem Frijhoff, Marijke Spies, Dutch Culture in a European Perspective 1: 1650: Hard-Won Unity, Uitgeverij Van Gorcum 2004, pp 310–11.

1625 births
1687 deaths
17th-century Dutch people
Dutch Calvinist and Reformed theologians
17th-century German Protestant theologians
Academic staff of Leiden University
Leiden University alumni
University of Groningen alumni
People from Austrian Silesia
Dutch people of German descent
People from Brzeg
German male non-fiction writers
17th-century German writers
17th-century German male writers